The agents in this list have been classified in group 2A (probable carcinogens)  by the International Agency for Research on Cancer (IARC). The term "agent" encompasses both substances and exposure circumstances that pose a risk. This designation is applied when there is limited evidence of carcinogenicity in humans as well as sufficient evidence of carcinogenicity in experimental animals. In some cases, an agent may be classified in this group when there is inadequate evidence of carcinogenicity in humans along with sufficient evidence of carcinogenicity in experimental animals and strong evidence that the carcinogenesis is mediated by a mechanism that also operates in humans. Exceptionally, an agent may be classified in this group solely on the basis of limited evidence of carcinogenicity in humans.

Agents

Substances
Acrylamide
Adriamycin
Androgenic (anabolic) steroids
Azacitidine
BCNU (Bischloroethyl nitrosourea)
Captafol
Chloral
Chloral hydrate
Chloramphenicol
α-Chlorinated toluenes (benzal chloride, benzotrichloride, benzyl chloride) and benzoyl chloride (combined exposures)
CCNU (1-(2-Chloroethyl)-3-cyclohexyl-1-nitrosourea)
4-Chloro-o-toluidine
Chlorozotocin
Cisplatin
Cyclopenta[c,d]pyrene
Diazinon
Dibenz[a,j]acridine
Dibenz[a,h]anthracene
Dibenzo[a,l]pyrene
Dichloromethane (methylene chloride)
4,4'-Dichlorodiphenyltrichloroethane (DDT)
Diethyl sulfate
Dieldrin, and aldrin metabolized to dieldrin
Dimethylcarbamoyl chloride
Dimethylformamide
1,2-Dimethylhydrazine
Dimethyl sulfate
Epichlorohydrin
Ethylene dibromide
Ethyl carbamate (urethane)
N-Ethyl-N-nitrosourea
Glycidol
Glyphosate
Hydrazine
Indium phosphide
2-Amino-3-methylimidazo[4,5-f]quinoline (IQ)
Lead compounds, inorganic
Malathion
5-Methoxypsoralen
Methyl methanesulfonate
Mercaptobenzothiozole
MNNG (N-Methyl-N'''-nitro-N-nitrosoguanidine)
N-Methyl-N-nitrosourea
Nitrate or nitrite (ingested) under conditions that result in endogenous nitrosation
Nitrogen mustard
1-Nitropyrene
N-Nitrosodiethylamine (DEN)
N-Nitrosodimethylamine (NDMA)
Nitrotoluene
6-Nitrochrysene
Phenacetin
Pioglitazone
Polybrominated biphenyls
Procarbazine hydrochloride
1,3-Propane sultone
Silicon carbide whiskers
Styrene (industrial exposure)
Styrene-7,8-oxide
Teniposide
Tetrabromobisphenol A
3,3',4,4'-Tetrachloroazobenzene
Tetrachloroethylene
Tetrafluoroethylene
1,2,3-Trichloropropane
Tris(2,3-dibromopropyl) phosphate
Vinyl bromide
Vinyl fluoride

Pathogens
Malaria (caused by infection with Plasmodium falciparum'' in holoendemic areas)
Human papillomavirus type 68
Merkel cell polyomavirus (MCV)

Mixtures
Bitumens, occupational exposure to oxidized bitumens and their emissions during roofing
Creosotes (from coal tars)
High-temperature frying, emissions from
Household combustion of biomass fuel (primarily wood), indoor emissions from
Non-arsenical insecticides (occupational exposures in spraying and application of)
Red meat (consumption of)
Mate, hot (see Very hot beverages)
Very hot beverages at above 65 °C (drinking)

Exposure circumstances
Art glass, glass containers and pressed ware (manufacture of)
Carbon electrode manufacture
Cobalt metal with tungsten carbide
Hairdresser or barber (occupational exposure as a)
Petroleum refining (occupational exposures in)
Night shift work

References

External links
 Description of the list of classifications, IARC
 List of Classifications (latest version)

 List of Classifications by cancer sites with sufficient or limited evidence in humans, Volumes 1 to 124 (Last update: 8 July 2019)

 

ja:IARC発がん性リスク一覧